The 2005 Big Sky men's basketball tournament was played from March 5 to March 9. The First Round of the tournament was held at the higher seed's home arena, and the semi-finals and championship were held at the Memorial Coliseum in Portland, Oregon, which is the home of regular season champion Portland State. The top 6 teams from regular season play qualified and the top 2 teams received a bye to the semi-finals.

Bracket

Tournament
Big Sky Conference men's basketball tournament
Big Sky Conference men's basketball tournament
Big Sky Conference men's basketball tournament
Big Sky Conference men's basketball tournament
Basketball competitions in Portland, Oregon
College sports tournaments in Oregon